Artur Nabantino Gonçalves de Azevedo (7 July 1855 – 22 October 1908) was a Brazilian playwright, short story writer, chronicler, journalist and Parnassian poet. He is famous for consolidating in Brazil the "comedy of manners" genre, initiated by Martins Pena.

He founded and occupied the 29th chair of the Brazilian Academy of Letters from 1897 until his death in 1908.

Life
Azevedo was born in the city of São Luís, in Maranhão, to the Portuguese vice-consul in Brazil David Gonçalves de Azevedo and Emília Amália Pinto de Magalhães. He was the older brother of Naturalist novelist Aluísio Azevedo, famous for writing O Mulato, O Cortiço and Casa de Pensão.

Azevedo would show a love for theatre since he was a child. Initially working as a salesman, he later got a job at the provincial administration, but was fired for writing satires against the government. He later found a job as an amanuensis in the Brazilian Ministry of Agriculture.

Later beginning a promissory career as a journalist, he worked for the newspapers A Estação, where he met Machado de Assis, and Novidades, where he met Alcindo Guanabara, Moreira Sampaio, Olavo Bilac and Coelho Neto.

He died in 1908.

Works

Poetry
 Carapuças (1871)
 Sonetos (1876)

Short story collections
 Contos Possíveis (1889)
 Contos Fora de Moda (1894)
 Contos Efêmeros (1897)
 Contos em Verso (1898)

Theatre plays
 Amor por Anexins (1872)
 A Filha de Maria Angu (1876)
 Uma Véspera de Reis (1876)
 A Pele do Lobo (1877)
 Joia (1879)
 O Anjo da Vingança (1882 — in partnership with Urbano Duarte de Oliveira)
 O Escravocrata (1884 — in partnership with Urbano Duarte de Oliveira)
 Almanjarra (1888)
 Fritzmack (1889 — in partnership with Aluísio Azevedo)
 A Capital Federal (1897)
 O Badejo (1898)
 Confidências (1898)
 O Jagunço (1898)
 Comeu! (1901)
 O Retrato a Óleo (1902)
 O Dote (1907)

External links

 Biography of Artur Azevedo 
 Artur Azevedo's biography at the official site of the Brazilian Academy of Letters 
 
 

1855 births
1908 deaths
Brazilian male poets
Brazilian male dramatists and playwrights
Brazilian people of Portuguese descent
Members of the Brazilian Academy of Letters
People from São Luís, Maranhão
19th-century Brazilian poets
19th-century Brazilian dramatists and playwrights
19th-century Brazilian male writers